Houston Parish is a cadastral parish in Parkes Shire and Kennedy County, central New South Wales. It lies on the southern boundary of Alectown township, and its most prominent landmark is the Parkes radio telescope.    

Prior to European settlement, the Houston/Mcphail areas was inhabited by the Wiradjuri people. Major Thomas Mitchell and John Oxley were early explorers in the area. The area was first opened up in the 19th century gold rush of western New South Wales, with both companies and artisan mining striking rich veins at Mcphaile for about 20 years. A village soon sprung up but no evidence of the village remains today, and the main economic activity is wheat and sheep.

References

Parishes of Kennedy County